Distillation is a process in which we separate components of different vapour pressure. One fraction leaves overhead and is condensed to distillate and the other is the bottom product. The bottom product is mostly liquid while the overhead fraction can be vapour or an aerosol. 
This method requires the components to have different volatility to be separated.

The column consists of three sections: a stripping section, a rectification section, and a feed section.

For rectification and stripping a countercurrent liquid phase must flow through the column, so that liquid and vapour can contact each other on each stage.

The distillation column is fed with a mixture containing the mole fraction xf of the desired compound. The overhead mixture is a gas or an aerosol which contains the mole fraction xD of the desired compound and the bottom product contains a mixture with the fraction xB of the desired compound.

An overhead condenser is a heat exchange equipment used for condensing the mixture leaving the top of the column. Either cooling water or air is used as a cooling agent.

An overhead accumulator is a horizontal pressure vessel containing the condensed mixture.
Pumps can be used to control the reflux to the column.

A Reboiler produces the vapour stream in the distillation column. It can be used internally and externally.

Math model
The total molar hold up in the nth tray Mn is considered constant.
The imbalances in the input and output flows are taken into account for in the component and the heat balance equations.

Inlet 

Outlet 

Mass balance 

, with 

By differentiating and substituting above equation we get:

Energy Balance 

By substituting the mass balance equation in above equation we get the following expression:

References 

Distillation
Separation processes
Laboratory techniques